In sports, a dynasty is a team or individual that dominates their sport or league for an extended length of time.  Some leagues usually maintain official lists of dynasties, often as part of a hall of fame, but in many cases, whether a team or individual has achieved a dynasty is subjective. This can result in frequent topic of debate among sports fans due to lack of consensus and agreement in the many different variables and criteria that fans may use to define a sports dynasty. Merriam-Webster describes a dynasty as a "sports franchise which has a prolonged run of successful seasons". Within the same sport, or even the same league, dynasties may be concurrent with each other.

Association football

Club

American Major League Soccer
 D.C. United, 1996 to 1999 (three MLS championships in four years and two Supporters' Shields). In addition to the MLS Championships D.C. United won other American and regional titles during this time.  In 1996 D.C. United won the Lamar Hunt US Open Cup and in 1998 D.C. United won the CONCACAF Champions Cup as the best team in North America and later in the same year won the InterAmerican Cup against the champions of South America.
 LA Galaxy, 2009 to 2015 (three MLS championships in four years and two Supporters Shields as first place team in the regular season. Additionally, the team has four Western Conference titles and has had great players such as David Beckham, Landon Donovan and Robbie Keane.

Argentine Primera División
 Boca Juniors, 1998 to 2008. In their "Golden Era", the Xeneizes, led by Riquelme, Palermo, Tevez, among others, won seven domestic championships (five Torneo Apertura and two Torneo Clausura), four Copa Libertadores (2000, 2001, 2003 and 2007), two Copa Sudamericana (2004 and 2005), three Recopa Sudamericana (2005, 2006 and 2008), and two Intercontinental Cup (2000 and 2003)

Belarus Highest League
 BATE Borisov won 13 consecutive national championships from 2006 to 2018 and became first and only Belarusian club that participated in the UEFA Champions League group stage (2008/09, 2011/12, 2012/13, 2014/15, 2015/16).

Brazilian Campeonato Brasileiro
 Santos of the late 1950s, the whole of the 1960s and early 1970s. During that period, the team, led by the likes of Pelé, Pepe, Zito and Gilmar, became known as Os Santásticos ("The Santastics"). They won the Taça Brasil and the Torneio Roberto Gomes Pedrosa (forerunners of the Brazilian Championship) six times in eight seasons between 1961 and 1968, back-to-back Copas Libertadores and Intercontinental Cups in 1962 and 1963 and 12 São Paulo state championships between 1955 and 1973. The club was also a major contributor of players to the Brazilian squads that won three World Cup titles won in 1958, 1962 and 1970.
 Cruzeiro of the late 1960s and early 1970s. The club won one Brazilian championship (1966) and one Copa Libertadores (1976), appearing on three straight Libertadores semifinals and four national championship finals, also winning nine Minas Gerais state championships.
 Flamengo of the 1980s. Led by Zico and featuring players such as Júnior, Andrade and Leandro, the team won three Brazilian Championships, one Copa União, one Copa Libertadores and one Intercontinental Cup between 1980 and 1987.
 Palmeiras of the 1960s and early 1970s. During that period, the club became known as "The Football Academy", for the two great squads it assembled. The First Academy, in the 1960s, won four Brazilian Championships, three São Paulo state championships, one Rio-São Paulo regional championship and became the first Brazilian side to reach a Copa Libertadores final, in 1961 (losing to Peñarol. The Second Academy, in the early 1970s, won consecutive Brazilian Championships in 1972 and 1973 and two São Paulo state championships. Notable players that were part of those teams included Ademir da Guia, Djalma Santos, Émerson Leão, Luís Pereira and Júlio Botelho.
 São Paulo of the 2000s. The team won the Copa Libertadores and the FIFA Club World Cup in 2005 and went on to become the first club of the Brazilian Championship era to win the national title for three seasons in a row (2006, 2007 and 2008). Aside from that, São Paulo qualified for the Libertadores through the Brazilian Championship for seven straight seasons (2004–2010), also a national record. During that period, the team was captained by goalkeeper Rogério Ceni and featured players such as Diego Lugano, Miranda and Hernanes.
 Internacional of the 1970s. The team won the Brazilian Championship in 1975, 1976 and 1979, the latter without a single defeat – the first and, so far, only unbeaten season in the Brazilian Championship era. The club also reached the 1980 Copa Libertadores final and won 13 of 16 Rio Grande do Sul state championships between 1969 and 1984. Great players from that period included Paulo Roberto Falcão, Elías Figueroa, Paulo César Carpegiani and Valdomiro.

Canadian Premier League
 Forge FC, 2019 to 2022. Led by head coach and technical director Bobby Smyrniotis, Forge FC went to four league finals in four years, winning three championships. During this era, the club also won one regular season championship in 2021.

Colombian Categoría Primera A
 Millonarios of the 1950s won four league championships three of which were back to back. They also won four back to back in the 1960s, and a Copa Colombia in 1962 and 1963. Alfredo Di Stéfano won three league titles, 1949–1952. A Copa Bodas de Oro del Real Madrid in 1952, as well as a Copa Colombia, Pequeña Copa del Mundo in 1953.
 América de Cali: Between 1979 and 1986 won six league championships, five of them being back to back from 1982 to 1986. During these years they fielded Willington Ortiz, Alexander Escobar Gañán, Antony de Ávila, Roberto Cabañas, Ricardo Gareca, and Julio César Falcioni. In the early 2000s they won three more league championships back to back from 2000 to 2002, a Copa Ciudad Viña del Mar in 2000, and a Copa Sky in 2001. During these years they had some of the best young Colombian talent on their team, which included, Fabián Andrés Vargas, Róbinson Zapata, David Ferreira, Jersson González, and Jairo Castillo. In 2008 they won their latest league championship and a Copa Cafam. Internationally, they were the runner-up of the Copa Libertadores for three consecutive years from 1985 to 1987. In 1996 International Federation of Football History & Statistics (IFFHS) ranked América de Cali as the second best world's club side of the year, only beaten by then world champions Juventus.
 Atlético Nacional: Between 2005 and 2007, after the league decided to split the year into two semesters, Atlético Nacional won three championships. Two of them being back to back in 2007.

English First Division and Premier League
 Liverpool between 1972 and 1990. During those eighteen years, the club became English champions on eleven occasions, under the successive guidance of Bill Shankly, Bob Paisley, Joe Fagan and Kenny Dalglish. Other domestic honours won during the period were the FA Cups in 1974, 1986 and 1989 and the League Cups, won on four consecutive occasions from 1981 to 1984. This dominance was extended to the European stage, beginning in 1972–73 when the club won the second-tier UEFA Cup. Further success in this competition arrived in 1975–76, before Liverpool embarked on a run of four top-tier European Cup wins between 1976–77 and 1983–84. No other English club has achieved such success in the premier European club competition since then. Liverpool reached their finest hour in the 1983–84 season when, with Joe Fagan at the helm, they became English champions while also winning the League Cup and the European Cup final against Roma.
 Manchester United created one of the biggest dynasties that lasted from the start of the Premier League in 1992–93 to 2012–13. After six seasons of Sir Alex Ferguson rebuilding the club, the team won the first-ever Premier League title, which was also their eighth top-tier league title. This victory was only the beginning of dominance, as the club won the league title twelve more times, setting a new English record of 20 top-tier titles. Manchester United also lifted the FA Cup during this period with victories in 1993–94, 1995–96, 1998–99 and 2003–04. Furthermore, United became the Champions of Europe twice during that time span, as well as reaching a further two finals. They won the Champions League in 1998–99 (completing the treble of league title, FA Cup and European Cup) and 2007–08. During this time, the club finished no lower than third in each Premier League season.
 Manchester City succeeded their rivals as the pre-eminent team in the Premier League, having won six titles since 2011–12 Premier League, including a pair of two-in-a-row sequences. Additionally, they have won two FA Cups and six league cups in that time span. City's dominion of the league strengthened since Pep Guardiola took charge of the team in 2016; they won four of the last five titles. Guardiola also guided them to their first-ever European Cup final in 2021.

French Ligue 1
 Olympique Lyonnais from 2001 to 2002 to the 2007–08 seasons in Ligue 1. Lyon became the first French club to win a national record-breaking streak of seven successive titles, including six consecutive Trophée des Champions. It also managed to win a Coupe de France in 2008.
 Paris Saint-Germain from 2012 to present in Ligue 1. PSG won seven Ligue 1 championships in eight seasons (2013, 2014, 2015, 2016, 2018, 2019, 2020). They also won four straight Coupe de France titles from 2015 to 2018 with another in 2020, as well as 5 straight Coupe de la Ligue titles from 2014 to 2018.

German Bundesliga
 Bayern Munich from 1971 to present. Bayern have won the Bundesliga a record 30 times, more than twice its closest Bundesliga contender. Bayern also won the European Cup three times in a row from 1974 to 1976, and won the Champions League subsequently in 2001, 2013, and 2020. Bayern became the first German club to win the quadruple in the 2012–13 season, winning the Bundesliga, DFB-Pokal, Champions League and DFL-Supercup. They have won the last ten Bundesliga titles, from 2013 to 2022.
 Borussia Mönchengladbach from 1969–70 to 1976–77. Borussia Mönchengladbach became Bundesliga champions in 5 of 8 seasons. This has been achieved against strong opposition from Bayern Munich and notably in all three seasons in which Bayern won the European Cup in a row (1974 to 1976).

Greek Superleague
 Olympiacos are the most successful club in Greek football history, with 46 Greek League titles and 28 Greek Cups.

Italian Football Championship and Serie A league
 Genoa from 1898 to 1904 in Italian football having won six Italian championship titles in seven years (in a double three peat sequence) using the Cambridge's Pyramid.
 Pro Vercelli from 1908 to 1913 in Italian football having won five Italian championship titles in six years. Also, the Vercelli's club players during that period constituted the backbone of the nascent national team.
 Juventus from 1930–31 to 1934–35 seasons in Italian football. During Edoardo Agnelli presidency and with the technical guidance of Carlo Carcano, who implemented in the team the Metodo tactic scheme; the club dominated the 1930s winning five consecutive national championships—at the time the solely top flight competition in the country—, a national record that will stand for the next 82 years which allowed the Turinese side to form the core of the Italy national team during the Vittorio Pozzo's era, including the 1933–1935 Central European International Cup winner team and the 1934 world champion squad.
 A second successful period was in the late 1950s and early 1960s, having won three national league titles –including the tenth, which established a new national record for titles won– and two Coppa Italia in four years (1957–1961) with a squad led by Giampiero Boniperti, John Charles and the 1961 European Footballer of the Year Omar Sívori. During that period, Italian Football Federation (FIGC) introduced the stella d'oro (golden star), a symbol for any team to have won at least 10 national titles, being this the first registered case worldwide.
 From the 1971–72 to the 1985–86, during Giampiero Boniperti presidency and under the successive management of former footballers Čestmír Vycpálek, Carlo Parola and Giovanni Trapattoni, became Italian champions nine times and won the Italian Cup twice, establishing the most enduring dynasty in Italian association football history. During the second half of the 1970s, Trapattoni succesfully implemented in the team the Zona mista tactic scheme. Such triumphs allowed i Bianconeri to form the backbone of the Italian national team during Enzo Bearzot's era, including the 1978 FIFA World Cup semifinalist and 1982 world champion squads, achieving with the latter its first title in the competition in 44 years. The club's dominance was extended to the international spotlight starting in 1977 when the club won the UEFA Cup without foreign footballers, an unprecedented achievement for any country's team. Subsequently, the club lifted the Cup Winners' Cup and the European Champions Cup becoming the first club in the history of European football to have won all three seasonal confederation competitions. Finally, after their triumph in the 1984 UEFA Super Cup and the 1985 Intercontinental Cup, the first title for a European side since the restructuring of the tournament occurred five years beforehand; the club also became the first in football history—and remained the world's only one until 2022—to have won all possible official continental tournaments and the world title, leading the UEFA rankings for the first time in the decade's ending.
 A further triumphs era for the club was established in the late 1990s and early 2000s when Juventus, under the coaching of Marcello Lippi, won five Serie A titles in nine years from 1995 to 2003. In that period, the Torinese club also won one Italian Cup, four Supercoppa Italiana, one Intercontinental Cup, one Champions League, one UEFA Super Cup and one UEFA Intertoto Cup, leading also the confederation classify in the ending 1990s.
 A renewed successful period begins from 2011–12 to 2019–20 seasons, during Andrea Agnelli presidency and with the successive coaching of former player Antonio Conte, Massimiliano Allegri and Maurizio Sarri; where the club won nine straight Serie A titles and four Italian Cups in a row (2015–2018), establishing new all-time record of successive triumphs in both competitions. Also, in the league championship, the club was the first in 20 years and the first in a championship with 20 teams contestants to have won a title unbeaten (2011–12) and has established the historic record of points made in the competition (102 in 2013–14) as well as the records of most wins in a single season (33 in 2013–14) and most consecutive wins during a single season (25 in 2015–16). During this time, Juventus reached a record of four national doubles in a row since 2015 to 2018 and one Italian treble (2016), won also four national super cups and also appeared in two Champions League finals.
 Torino during the 1940s in Italian football due of their success in the league championships in 1942–43 and from 1945–46 to 1948–49. This team notably won a historic five consecutive league titles and were given the moniker Grande Torino by the press.
 A.C. Milan experienced several successful periods during their history. In the 1950s, having won four league titles and two Latin Cups, which was considered a predecessor of club tournaments in Europe, namely the European Cup. From the 1987–88 to the 1994–96 seasons Milan won five Serie A titles. Also, they were able to secure four Supercoppa Italiana in 1988, 1992, 1993 and 1994. Internationally, Milan honours included three UEFA Champions Leagues in 1988–89, 1989–90 and 1993–94 seasons, three UEFA Super Cup titles (1989, 1990 and 1994) and two Intercontinental Cups (1989 and 1990). In this period, the game philosophy of then manager Arrigo Sacchi was focused on a highly fluid and organized game, zonal marking and intense pressing in the midfield line. He did so while at the same time securing one of the strongest defending packages of all time, thanks to individuals such as Franco Baresi and Paolo Maldini. In the 2000s, namely between 2002-03 and 2006-07 season, Milan achieved important successes, having won one Serie A title, one Coppa Italia, one Supercoppa Italiana, two UEFA Champions Leagues, two UEFA Super Cups and one FIFA Club World Cup.
 Inter Milan During the Grande Inter era of the mid-1960s, Inter, managed by Helenio Herrera, won three Serie A titles, 1962–63, 1964–65 and 1965–66, as well as back-to-back European Cups (1963–64 and 1964–65) and Intercontinental Cups (1964 & 1965).
 A second golden era was from 2004–05 to 2010–11 getting a record of five consecutive national championships titles won, four Coppa Italia (2004–05, 2005–06, 2009–10, 2010–11), four Supercoppa Italiana (2005, 2006, 2008 and 2010) and one Champions League (2009–2010) and one Club World Cup (2010). Inter was managed by Roberto Mancini (2004–08), José Mourinho (2008–10), Rafael Benítez (2010) and Leonardo Araújo (2010–2011) with a squad led by Javier Zanetti, Diego Milito, Samuel Eto'o, Maicon, and Zlatan Ibrahimović.

Japanese J.League
 Kashima Antlers from 1996 to 2002, won the J.League title four times, the J.League Cup three times and the Emperor's Cup two times. In 2000, Kashima became the first J.League team to achieve the "treble", by winning all three major titles: J.League, J.League Cup, and Emperor's Cup in the same year.
 Kashima Antlers from 2007 to 2012, won the 2007 J.League title they became the first and only team in Japan to have won ten domestic titles in the professional era. In 2008 they became the first and only club to successfully defend the J.League title on two separate occasions. In 2009 they became the first and only club to win three consecutive J.League titles. With victories in back to back J.League Cups in 2011, 2012 and most recently followed by their 2015 victory, Kashima extended their unmatched record of major domestic titles in the professional era to seventeen.

Korean K League 1
 Ilhwa Chunma from 1992 to 1996 ("the 1st Ilhwa dynasty"), led by Park Jong-hwan, reigned as the champions in the K League for three consecutive seasons (1993, 1994, 1995) and won the Korean League Cup in 1992. The club also won the Asian Club Championship (the older edition of the current AFC Champions League) in 1995 (thus achieving the "International Double"). In 1996, the club won the now defunct Asian Super Cup and the Afro-Asian Club Championship.
 Seonnam Ilhwa Chunma from 2001 to 2004 ("the 2nd Ilhwa dynasty"), led by Cha Kyung-bok, once again dominated the K League for three consecutive seasons (1993, 1994, 1995) and won two Korean League Cup titles in 2002 (thus achieving the "Domestic Double") and 2004. The club won the Korean Super Cup in 2002 and the A3 Champions Cup in 2004.

Scottish Football League
 Celtic — ten Scottish Football League title from 1904–05 to 1916–17 including six-in-a-row and three Scottish Cup doubles. Later eleven titles from 1965–66 to 1978–79 including a new record of nine-in-a-row and becoming the first British European champions in 1967 as part of a quadruple of trophies with the Scottish Cup and Scottish League Cup. Celtic won six further Scottish Cups and five more League Cups in the wider period, besides losing the 1970 European Cup Final. A further Celtic dynasty emerged from 2011–12 to 2019–20; in that time frame the club won another nine consecutive league titles, as well as four consecutive domestic trebles from 2016–17 to 2019–20.
 Rangers — sixteen titles from 1917–18 to 1938–39 including five-in-a-row and four Scottish Cup doubles; arguably continued until 1949–50 as intervening years during World War II featured seven consecutive unofficial titles, followed by three in the first four official post-war seasons (a treble and two doubles). Later eighteen titles from 1986–87 to 2010–11, including nine in a row from 1988–89 to 1996–97, which also included three Scottish Cups and five League Cups (six doubles and one treble); they won six further Scottish Cups and ten more League Cups in the wider period.

Spanish La Liga
 Real Madrid won 12 La Liga titles in 16 seasons (from 1953–54 to 1968–69, including a five-in-a-row sequence in 1961–65), as well as reaching eight European Cup finals in 11 seasons (from 1955–56 to 1965–66; won six, including five in a row in 1956–60). They also won five consecutive league titles in 1986–90. The club's most recent dynasty formed as part of their gálactico transfer policy, with the team reaching eight consecutive Champions League semi-finals from 2010–11 to 2017–18 and winning five titles between 2014 and 2022, including a three-in-a-row sequence.
 Barcelona from the 2004–05 season to 2019–20. They won ten La Liga championships and four Champions League titles, including an unprecedented six major trophies in 2009, and became the first Spanish team to win the treble. They also became the first team to win the treble twice in European football in the 2014–15 season.

Collegiate
 North Carolina Tar Heels women's soccer, 1979–2012 (22 national championships in 34 years, 21 of those are NCAA Tournament Championships). This also includes 9 consecutive NCAA Tournament Championships from 1986 to 1994, and 15 consecutive ACC Tournament Championships from 1989 to 2003. Also, they boast a 90% win rate, having won 704 games and lost or tied only 78 games.

Australian football

VFL/AFL 
 1904–1910, winning three-peat in 1906–1908, reaching the grand final 3 more times.
 1925–1930, winning four-peat in 1927–1930, reaching the grand final 2 more times.
 1939–1941, winning three-peat.
 1941–1951, winning in 1942, 1946, 1949 and 1950, reaching the grand final 5 more times.
 1954–1964, winning three-peat in 1955-1957 then 1959, 1960 and 1964, reaching the grand final 2 more times.
 1965–1973, winning in 1965, 1968, 1970 and 1972, reaching the grand final 2 more times.
 1967–1974, winning in 1967, 1969, 1973 and 1974, reaching the grand final once more. 
 1979–1982, winning in 1979, 1981 and 1982.
 1983–1991, winning in 1983, 1986, 1988, 1989 and 1991, reaching the grand final 3 more times.
 2001–2004, winning three-peat in 2001–2003, reaching the grand final once more.  
 2007–2011, winning in 2007, 2009 and 2011, reaching the grand final once more.
 2008–2015, winning in 2008 and three-peat in 2013–2015, reaching the grand final once more.
 2017–2020, winning in 2017, 2019 and 2020.

SANFL
Norwood 1878–1885, winning six-peat, finishing second 2 more times.
South Adelaide 1892–1900, winning in 1892, 1893, 1895, 1896, 1898 and 1899, finishing second 3 more times.
West Adelaide 1908–1912, winning in 1908, 1909, 1911 and 1912.
Port Adelaide 1909–1915, winning in 1910, 1913 and 1914, reaching the grand final 4 more times.
Norwood 1922–1925, winning in 1922, 1923 and 1925.
Port Adelaide 1936–1939, winning in 1936, 1937 and 1939, reaching the grand final once more.
Norwood 1946–1950, winning in 1946, 1948 and 1950, reaching the grand final once more.
Port Adelaide 1951–1965, winning in 1951, six-peat in 1954–1959, 1962 and 1965, reaching the grand final 2 more times.
Sturt 1965–1970, winning five-peat in 1966–1970, reaching the grand final once more.
Port Adelaide 1977–1981, winning in 1977, 1979, 1980 and 1981.
Port Adelaide 1988–1999, winning three-peat in 1988–1990, 1992 three-peat in 1994–1996, 1998 and 1999, reaching the grand final once more.
Central District 2000–2011, winning in 2000, 2001, three-peat in 2003–2005, four-peat in 2007–2010, reaching the grand final 3 more times.
Norwood 2010–2014, winning three-peat in 2012–2014, reaching the grand final once more.

WAFL
Unions/Fremantle (II) 1886–1892, winning four-peat in 1887–1890, five-peat in 1892-1896 and 1898.
East Fremantle 1899–1914, winning in 1900, three-peat in 1902–1904, 1906, three-peat in 1908-1910 and 1914, finishing second 5 more times. 
Subiaco 1912–1915, winning in 1912, 1913 and 1915
East Perth 1918–1923, winning five-peat in 1919–1923, reaching the grand final once more.
East Fremantle 1928–1933, winning four-peat in 1928-1931 and 1933.
West Perth 1932–1935, winning in 1932, 1934 and 1935.
Claremont 1936–1940, winning three-peat in 1938–1940, reaching the grand final 2 more times.
East Fremantle 1943–1946, winning in 1943, 1945 and 1946, reaching the grand final once more. 
South Fremantle 1947–1956, winning in 1947, 1948, 1950, three-peat in 1952–1954, reaching the grand final 2 more times. 
East Perth 1956-1961, winning in 1956, 1958 and 1959, reaching the grand final 2 more times.
Swan Districts 1961-1965, winning three-peat in 1961-1963, reaching the grand final once more. 
Perth 1966-1968, winning three-peat in 1966-1968, reaching the grand final once more. 
Swan Districts 1980-1984, winning three-peat in 1982-1984, reaching the grand final once more. 
Claremont 1987–1996, winning in 1987, 1989, 1991, 1993 and 1996, reaching the grand final 3 more times.
East Perth 2000-2002, winning three-peat.
Subiaco 2003-2011, winning in 2004, three-peat in 2006-2008, reaching the grand final 3 more times.
Subiaco 2014-, winning in 2014, 2015, 2018, 2019 and 2021, reaching the grand final 2 more times. (in this case, the dynasty will end if Subiaco fail to reach the grand final in 2023)

Baseball

Major League Baseball

 Boston Red Sox from 1903 to 1918; dominated the sport for sixteen seasons during the "dead-ball era", with five World Series titles in 1903, 1912, 1915, 1916, and 1918, and six American League pennants in 1903, 1904, 1912, 1915, 1916, and 1918.
 Philadelphia Athletics from 1910 to 1914; The Athletics won 3 World Series titles in 4 years in 1910, 1911, and 1913. The Athletics also won a pennant in 1914. They were known for their "$100,000 Infield".
 New York Yankees: From 1921 to 1964, the Yankees played in 29 of the 44 World Series, winning 20 of them. During this 44-year period, the Yankees had two dominant stretches:
 From 1936 to 1943 the Yankees dominated baseball for eight years, capturing seven American League pennants and six World Series Championships, including four World Series in a row from 1936 to 1939.
 From 1947 to 1964 the Yankees won 15 of 18 AL pennants and 10 World Series, including five in a row from 1949 to 1953. This is the MLB record for most consecutive championships.
 St. Louis Cardinals from 1942 to 1946, led by superstars Stan Musial, Red Schoendienst, and Enos Slaughter. They won four NL Pennants and three World Series titles in five-year span (1942, 1944, 1946).
 1959-1966 Los Angeles Dodgers. 4 World Series appearances, with 3 World Series Titles in 1959, 1963 and 1965, and were led by one of the best starting rotations in baseball.
 Cincinnati Reds from 1970 to 1976. Known as The Big Red Machine, they dominated the sport for 7 years (5 National League West Division titles, four National League pennants in 1970, 1972, 1975 and 1976, and two World Series titles in 1975 and 1976. The team's combined record from 1970 to 1976 was 683 wins and 443 losses, an average of nearly 98 wins per season).
 Oakland Athletics: From 1971 to 1975, known as The Mustache Gang, won the World Series in 1972, 1973, and 1974.
 New York Yankees: From 1996 to 2003. Led by manager Joe Torre, and The Core Four, the Yankees dominated the sport with 8-straight postseason appearances, winning 7 AL East division titles, 6 AL pennants in 1996, 1998, 1999, 2000, 2001 & 2003, & 4 World Series titles in 1996, 1998, 1999, and 2000. The Yankees added another World Series title in 2009 to make 5 championships won by the Core Four.

Negro leagues
The following are dynasties from Negro league baseball leagues in the United States.
 Homestead Grays, 1937–1945.  Eight Negro NationalLeague titles in nine seasons. Two Negro World Series titles in 1942 and 1943.

Nippon Professional Baseball
 Yomiuri Giants: From 1961 to 1973. The Giants won 9 consecutive Japan Series titles between 1965 and 1973.
 Saitama Seibu Lions: From 1982 to 1992. The Lions won 8 Japan Series titles over 11 seasons (1982, 1983, 1986, 1987, 1988, 1990, 1991, 1992).
 Fukuoka SoftBank Hawks: From 2011 to the present. The Hawks won 7 Japan Series titles over 10 seasons (2011, 2014, 2015, 2017, 2018, 2019, 2020).

Korea Baseball Organization
 Kia Tigers: From 1983 to 1997. The Tigers won 9 titles (1983, 1986, 1987, 1988, 1989, 1991, 1993, 1996, 1997).

Basketball

Professional

American Basketball Association
 Indiana Pacers from 1969 to 1975 led by star players such as Freddie Lewis, Roger Brown, Mel Daniels, and George McGinnis. The Pacers won 5 ABA Conference Championships in 1969, 1970, 1972, 1973, and 1975 and won the ABA Championship in 1970, 1972, and 1973. Other noteworthy accomplishments include 3 consecutive ABA division titles in 1969, 1970, and 1971, their playoff berths in every year of the ABA's existence, as well as their place as the winningest franchise in ABA history.

National Basketball Association
 Minneapolis Lakers 1949 to 1954 led by George Mikan and head coach John Kundla. The Lakers officially won 5 NBA championships (in 1949, 1950, 1952, 1953, and 1954) in six years between the 1948–49 BAA season and 1953–54 NBA season. Minneapolis also achieved the NBA's first set of three consecutive championships winning the 1952 NBA Finals, the 1953 NBA Finals, and the 1954 NBA Finals. Minneapolis also won the 1948 NBL Championship, which is not recognized by the NBA. When including the 1948 NBL title, the championship count rises to a spectacular six championships in seven years and also gives the Lakers another three-peat as they won the 1948 NBL Title, the 1949 BAA Championship, and the 1950 NBA Championship.
 Boston Celtics from 1957 to 1976 led by superstar Bill Russell and John Havlicek and head coach Red Auerbach. In these 20 seasons, Boston had won 13 NBA championships (1957, 1959, 1960, 1961, 1962, 1963, 1964, 1965, 1966, 1968, 1969, 1974, 1976. Boston won an unprecedented eight consecutive championships from 1959 to 1966. Boston also has the distinction of having played in 10 straight NBA Finals from 1957–1966.

 Los Angeles Lakers of 1979 to 1991 led by Magic Johnson, Kareem Abdul-Jabbar and James Worthy and head coach Pat Riley. They were known as Showtime Lakers for the highly entertaining flashy brand of basketball they played. In these 11 seasons, Los Angeles had won 5 NBA championships (1980, 1982, 1985, 1987, and 1988) in 9 years, 10 Division titles, and advanced to the NBA Finals 9 times between 1980 and 1991 including 4 straight appearances from 1982–1985. In the 1988 NBA Finals the Lakers became the first team since the Boston Celtics of the 1960s to win back-to-back NBA titles, having beaten the Celtics the previous year.
 Boston Celtics of 1979 to 1988 led by superstar Larry Bird, Kevin McHale and Robert Parish and head coach K.C. Jones. In these 9 seasons, Boston had won 3 NBA Championships (1981, 1984, and 1986) in 6 years and advanced to the NBA Finals 5 times between the 1981 and 1987 (including 4 consecutive appearances from 1984–1987). The 1986 Boston Celtics also set the record for best home winning percentage going 40–1 (97.5%).

 Chicago Bulls of 1990 to 1998 led by Michael Jordan, Scottie Pippen, Horace Grant (from 1991 to 1993), Dennis Rodman (from 1995 to 1998) and head coach Phil Jackson. In these 8 seasons, Chicago had won 6 NBA championships, with 2 sets of three consecutive championships, winning championships in 1991, 1992, and 1993, then subsequently winning the 1996, 1997, and 1998 titles. Chicago had also won 6 Eastern Conference titles and 6 division titles in 8 seasons. The Bulls set  the best combined regular and postseason record in NBA history (87–13, .870) during the 1995–96 season.

 San Antonio Spurs of 1999 to 2014 led by Tim Duncan, Tony Parker (2001-2014, Manu Ginóbili (2002-2014), David Robinson (1999–2003), Kawhi Leonard (2011–14), and head coach Gregg Popovich. In these 16 seasons, San Antonio had won 5 NBA championships (1999, 2003, 2005, 2007, and 2014), 6 Western Conference titles, and 11 division titles, plus 22 consecutive playoff appearances from 1998 to 2019. The Spurs were able to sustain a high level of consistency in Duncan's tenure with the team. The Spurs won 50+ games every season from 1997 to 1998 through 2015–16 (except the strike-shortened 1998–99 season), as well as a .707 win percentage during that span, the highest in any of the four major American sports).

 Los Angeles Lakers of 2000 to 2004 led by Shaquille O'Neal, Kobe Bryant, and head coach Phil Jackson. In these 5 seasons, Los Angeles had won 4 Western Conference titles in 2000, 2001, 2002 and 2004, accomplishing a three-peat in the process by winning championships from 2000 to 2002. The 2001 team went 15–1 in the playoffs, setting the record for the highest win percentage in single playoffs (later broken).
 Golden State Warriors of 2015 to present led by Stephen Curry, Kevin Durant (2016–19), Klay Thompson, Draymond Green, Andre Iguodala and head coach Steve Kerr. In these eight seasons, Golden State has won four NBA championships (2015, 2017, 2018, and 2022) and six Western Conference titles (five consecutive from 2015 to 2019 and in 2022). Throughout this dynasty, the Warriors have set many NBA records, most notably the best regular season (73–9 record in 2015–16), best postseason (16–1 record in 2017), and won at least 67 out of 82 games in three consecutive regular seasons from 2014–15 to 2016–17.

Women's National Basketball Association
 Houston Comets from 1997 to 2000 (4 consecutive WNBA championships)
 Detroit Shock from 2003 to 2008 (3 WNBA championships in 6 years)
 Minnesota Lynx from 2011 to 2017 (4 WNBA championships in 7 years)

Collegiate

NCAA Division I Men
 UCLA Bruins men's basketball from 1964 to 1975 under John Wooden (10 national championships in 12 seasons; 1964, 1965, 1967, 1968, 1969, 1970, 1971, 1972, 1973, 1975. They would also win 7 consecutive championships from 1967 to 1973, four undefeated seasons, and an NCAA record 88 consecutive wins).

NCAA Division I Women
 University of Tennessee Lady Volunteers basketball under Pat Summitt from 1987 to 1998 (six national championships in 12 seasons), including three consecutive championships from 1996 to 1998 (the first women's team to do so), one undefeated season setting the most wins ever with 39, and an overall record of 314–38 (.877).
 University of Connecticut under Geno Auriemma from 1995 thru present (11 championships in 17 seasons, including three consecutive championships from 2002 to 2004 and four consecutive from 2013 to 2016; five undefeated seasons in 2002, 2009, 2010, 2014 and 2016.  The Huskies set a record with a 90-game winning streak from November 2008 to December 2010, and would later break that record with a 111-game winning streak from November 2014 to March 2017.

Canadian university basketball
 Laurentian University Voyageurs women's basketball under head coach Norm Vickery won five consecutive CIAU national championships from 1975 through 1979.
 University of Victoria Vikes men's basketball under head coach Ken Shields won seven consecutive CIAU national championships from 1980 through 1986.
 University of Windsor Lancers women's basketball under head coach Chantal Vallée won five consecutive CIS national championships from 2011 through 2015.
 Carleton University Ravens men's basketball won five consecutive CIS/USports national championships from 2003 to 2007, seven consecutive national championships from 2011 to 2017, and 17 titles in 20 seasons between 2003 and 2023, 13 of the championship wins under head coach Dave Smart, 3 of the championship wins under head coach Taffe Charles.

Cross country and track
 United States Men's Olympic 4 × 100 meter team, 1916–1992
 Kenyan runners, 1968–1999
 University High School Normal Illinois 2010–2017 Men's and Women's Intercity Cross Country Championships

Cricket

Club
 The Mumbai cricket team from the 1950s to the 1970s enjoyed an unparalleled run in the Ranji Trophy, India's domestic first-class cricket championship. From the 1955–56 season to the 1972–73 season, Bombay (as it was known back then) won 17 of the 18 tournaments played, including a 15-year cup-winning streak from 1958–59 to 1972–73. As of 2020, the team has 41 tournament wins from 46 finals appearances (of 83 times the tournament has been held), with the next-best team (Karnataka) having won 8.

International 
 Australian national cricket team from 1945 through 1953.
 England cricket team in the 1950s.
 The West Indian cricket team dominated test cricket through the 1980s and early 1990s. The West Indian team was not beaten in a test series between March 1980 and May 1995, a fifteen-year span including twenty series wins and nine drawn series.
 Australian national cricket team from 1996 through 2007. The Australian cricket team is the only team to win the World Cup three consecutive times (1999, 2003, 2007) and they remained undefeated since their last defeat in group stages in 1999 World Cup against Pakistan. Their first loss in World Cup came in the 2011 World Cup group stage against Pakistan.

Handball

Club 
 The HC Spartak Kyiv, Kiev women's handball team, won thirteen out of 18 Champions' league titles from 1970 to 1988 (72% of titles) including two lines of four titles in a row.
 FC Barcelona Handbol, the men's Barcelona professional handball team, won an all-time best five consecutive Champions' League from 1995 to 2000.

International

Women 
 The Soviet Union women's national handball team was the first to dominate handball, doing so for fourteen years between 1976 and 1990. They won 63% of the gold medals in the process (5/8), 71% of entered tournaments considering the 1984 Summer Olympics boycott, including three consecutive world championships and being the first-ever to win back to back Olympic gold in 1980.
 The Denmark women's national handball team became the first team, in 1997, to hold all three major titles: world, Olympic and continental. Led by coach Jan Pytlick Denmark won its third Olympic gold medal in a row in 2004, for the first time in the history of handball. From 1996 to 2004 the team had won 50% of all major titles (6/12) including 56% of major tournament wins (5/9) from 1996 to 2002.
 Led by line player Else-Marthe Sørlie Lybekk and goalkeeper Katrine Lunde Haraldsen, the Norway women's national handball team became the only team in handball history, on the women's and men's side, to have won the Euro championship in handball four times in a row. They have won a total of six European championship gold medals, an all-time record. In 2011 they became the third team in the world to have held all three titles at the same time. In 2015 they are back to back Olympic and European champions. From 2004 to present they have won 53% (8/15) of major titles including 58% (7/12) between 2004 and 2012.

Men 
 In the 1950s/1960s, the Sweden men's national handball team was unbeaten for 10 years, becoming the first-ever team to win back to back world championships (8 year domination) and collecting consecutive medals for 24 years. At the time the world championship was the only major competition being played (continental championships first took place in the 1990s and handball was not an Olympic sport until 1972 except for the 1936 Olympics).
 For thirteen years the Romania men's national handball team was virtually unbeatable, led by Gheorghe Gruia they won four out of five world championships between 1961 and 1974, first ever team to land two back to back championships. Recorded an all-time best 80% of wins in major tournaments for a period of ten plus years.
 The Sweden men's national handball team dominated the game of handball in the late 1990s and early 2000s. Led by coach Bengt Johansson and key players Magnus Wislander and Staffan Olsson, they have won three European championships in a row from 1998 to 2002, winning 60% of the major tournaments held in this period of time (3/5), clinching silver or gold medals in eight consecutive major tournaments between 1996 and 2002 (four times winner, four times runner up).
 Led by coach Claude Onesta, goalie Thierry Omeyer and key playmaker Nikola Karabatić, the France men's national handball team was the first-ever to win five world championships in 2015, five out of ten world championships between 1995 and 2015. France is also the first men's team to have won back to back Olympic titles (2008 and 2012). In 2010 it became the first men's team to simultaneously hold Olympic, world and continental titles. In 2011 after another world championship title France men's team also clinched four consecutive major titles for the first time in the history of the game, women's included. In 2015 France holds all major titles for the third time in 5 years, three of the last five European championships and three of the last four world championships in play whilst being back to back Olympic champion. From 2008 to 2015 they have won seven out of nine major titles (78%) as well as 67% of wins for 9 years from 2006 to present (8/12).

Gridiron football

American football

National Football League

 Green Bay Packers 1929–1944. Led by Curly Lambeau, the Packers won five NFL Championship games throughout the Great Depression era, four of which came from the 1930s and one in the 1940s (1929, 1930, 1931, 1936, 1939, 1944).
 Chicago Bears 1940–1946. Led by George Halas, the Bears, which were dubbed The Monsters of the Midway, won four NFL Championship games throughout the decade (1940, 1941, 1943, 1946).
 Cleveland Browns 1950–1955. Led by head coach Paul Brown and quarterback Otto Graham, the Browns were just as successful as they were in the AAFC, winning three NFL Championship games throughout the 1950s (1950, 1954, 1955).
 Detroit Lions 1952–1957. Led by head coach Buddy Parker and with players such as Bobby Layne, Doak Walker, Joe Schmidt, and Jim Doran, the Lions won three NFL Championship games throughout the decade (1952, 1953, 1957), which was same amount of championships won by the Cleveland Browns who were their biggest rival at the time.
 Green Bay Packers 1960–1967. Led by head coach Vince Lombardi, Green Bay won five NFL championships in seven years (including Super Bowls I and II): 1961, 1962, 1965, 1966, 1967; and were championship finalists in 1960.
 Pittsburgh Steelers 1972–1979. Led by head coach Chuck Noll and players Terry Bradshaw, Franco Harris, Lynn Swann and the Steel Curtain defense. The Steelers won four Super Bowl titles in six years (1974, 1975, 1978, 1979), becoming the first and to date only team in NFL history to do so.  Eight straight playoff appearances and seven division titles from 1972 to 1979.
 San Francisco 49ers 1981–1994. Led by Joe Montana, Jerry Rice, Steve Young and head coaches Bill Walsh and George Seifert. This dynasty is usually considered to cover 1981 through 1989, a period in which the team won four Super Bowl championships (1981, 1984, 1988, 1989) and 8 division titles, but sometimes, the 1994 Super Bowl championship is also included due to the team's success through the 1980s and most of the 1990s.
 Dallas Cowboys 1991–1996. Led by head coaches Jimmy Johnson, and Barry Switzer and players Emmitt Smith, Troy Aikman, and Michael Irvin (The Triplets). First team to win three Super Bowls in four years (1992, 1993, 1995). Also won 3 conference championships in 4 straight appearances and 5 straight division titles.
 New England Patriots 2001–2019. Led by Tom Brady and Bill Belichick. Six Super Bowl titles in 19 years (2001, 2003, 2004, 2014, 2016, 2018) including becoming only the second team to win three Super Bowls in four years, three other Super Bowl appearances (2007, 2011, 2017), 13 AFC Championship Game appearances (2001, 2003, 2004, 2006, 2007, 2011–2018), and 17 AFC East Division titles (2001, 2003–2007, and 2009–2019). The 2007 season also saw the Patriots become only the second team in NFL history to record a perfect regular season and the first to do so in a 16-game season. During this time, the Patriots recorded the NFL's two longest winning streaks; 21 from 2003 to 2004, and 18 from 2007 to 2008. From 2001 to 2017 the Patriots have averaged over 12 wins per season and a .766 win percentage, the highest in any of the four major American sports. They also hold the distinction of being labeled "The Team of the 2000s" and "The Team of the 2010s" respectively.

American Football League
 Houston Oilers, 3 straight AFL Championship game appearances and two titles from 1960 to 1962.
 Buffalo Bills of the mid-1960s, three straight AFL Championship game appearances and two titles from 1964 to 1966.
 Dallas Texans/Kansas City Chiefs of the 1960s, being the most successful AFL team in the league before the merger of the AFL and NFL, and also having the highest win-loss ratio of any of team in the league before the merger took place, the Chiefs  appeared in three AFL Championships and won (1962, 1966, 1969), made two Super Bowl appearances (1966 & 1969) and won one Super Bowl (1969)  thanks to coach Hank Stram.

All-America Football Conference
 Cleveland Browns of the late 1940s. Won the AAFC championship in all four years of the league's existence (1946–49) including an undefeated season in 1948.

NCAA Football

Football Bowl Subdivision (Formerly I-A)

The problems inherent in identifying sports dynasties are exacerbated in NCAA Football Bowl Subdivision, where the national champion is determined, at least in part, by poll rather than through a tournament. These polls, however, are largely based on win–loss records, thereby relying on minimal subjectivity.  When fans of a sport cannot agree on which team within a league or other organization should be considered as holding that organization's championship, discussing whether a team has become a dynasty is more difficult. Because of these problems, teams that consistently win their conference championship and are frequently in contention for national championships are termed dynasties more often than a similarly performing team in another sport or division might.
 Yale – nineteen championships between 1874 and 1909
 Michigan – four straight championships, five straight undefeated seasons between 1901 and 1905.
 Pittsburgh, 1910–1918 – five championships in nine seasons (1910, 1915, 1916, 1917, 1918) 
 Notre Dame, 1919–1930. Led by head coach Knute Rockne. He won three national championships in 1924, 1929, and 1930 and an .892 winning percentage over 12 years.
 Pittsburgh, 1925–1938 – nine championships in fourteen seasons (1925, 1927, 1929, 1931, 1933, 1934, 1936, 1937, 1938) 
 Minnesota, 1934–1941. Led by head coach Bernie Bierman. He led Minnesota to five championships in eight seasons (1934, 1935, 1936, 1940, 1941).
 Army, 1944–46
 Notre Dame 1941–1953. Led by head coach Frank Leahy. He led Notre Dame to four national championships 1943, 1946, 1947, and 1949.
 Oklahoma, 1948–1958. Led by head coach Bud Wilkinson. The Sooners won three national championships in 1950, 1955, and 1956. The centerpiece of this run was his 47-game win streak (NCAA Record) from 1953 to 1957.
 Alabama, 1961–66 Led by Bear Bryant, Joe Namath, and Ken Stabler– three national championships. In 1961, 1964, and 1965 and going unbeaten in 1966, and had a record of 60-5-1 over the six-year span.
 Nebraska, 1969–72 . Led by head coach Bob Devaney and capturing consecutive national titles in 1970 and 1971. Nebraska's 1971 team remains the only champion ever to defeat the teams that finished second, third, and fourth (Oklahoma, Colorado, Alabama) in the final rankings.
 Oklahoma, 1971–75. Led by Barry Switzer winning back to back championships in 1974 and 1975.
 Alabama, 1973–80 Led by Bear Bryant winning national titles in 1973, 1978, and 1979.
 Miami, 1983–94 – Led by head coaches Howard Schnellenberger, Jimmy Johnson, and Dennis Erickson. In 12 seasons, Miami won four national championships (1983, 1987, 1989, 1991), played for seven national championships (1983, 1986, 1987, 1989, 1991, 1992, 1994), finished in the top three of the AP Poll for seven consecutive seasons (1986–92), and set an NCAA-record with 58 straight home victories. They also had two Heisman Trophy winners in Vinny Testaverde in 1986 and Gino Torretta in 1992.
 Florida State, 1987–2000 – At the height of Bobby Bowden's dominance, the Florida State Seminoles went 152–19–1, won nine ACC championships (1992–2000), two national championships (1993 and 1999), three national runner-up finishes (1996, 1998 and 2000), never lost the #1 AP ranking during 1999, produced 20 1st round NFL draft picks (including the 1997 offensive and defensive rookies of the year), won at least 10 games every year, and never finished a season ranked lower than fourth in the AP poll.  Quarterbacks Charlie Ward and Chris Weinke won Heisman Trophies.
 Nebraska, 1993–97 – Led by head coach Tom Osborne, defensive coordinator Charlie McBride, and players Tommie Frazier, Scott Frost, Ahman Green, Grant Wistrom and Jason Peter and the Blackshirts. They played for four national championships in '93, '94, '95, and '97. They won three national championships in four years (1994, 1995, 1997), 60–3 cumulative record and went unbeaten in the three national championship seasons. They won 26 straight games from 1994 to 1996.
 USC from 2002 to 2005. Led by head coach Pete Carroll, and players Carson Palmer, Matt Leinart, Reggie Bush, and LenDale White. They won two consecutive AP national championships (2003 and 2004), appearance in the 2005 National Championship Game, seven straight Pac-10 titles, six major bowl wins in seven years (Rose: 2003 and 2007–2009, Orange: 2004 and 2005), and maintained a 34-game winning streak from 2003 to 2005. They also produced three Heisman Trophy winners in Carson Palmer, Matt Leinart, and Reggie Bush in 2002, 2004, and 2005 respectively.
 Alabama, 2008–2020. Led by head coach Nick Saban, Alabama won six National Championships in 12 years (2009, 2011, 2012, 2015, 2017, 2020) and three national runner-up finishes (2016, 2018, 2021).  Alabama appeared in the first five College Football Playoffs from 2014 to 2018 and returned to the CFP in 2020. Since the 2008 season, Alabama has averaged 12 wins per season and have a record of 176-19. Alabama under Nick Saban has 4 Heisman Trophy winners in running backs Mark Ingram II and Derrick Henry in 2009 and 2015, wide receiver Devonta Smith in 2020, and quarterback Bryce Young in 2021, respectively.

Football Championship Subdivision (Formerly Division I-AA)
 Youngstown State (1991–1999): Led by head coach Jim Tressel. YSU won four national championships (1991, 1993, 1994, 1997) and appeared in six National Championship Games in nine years.
 Appalachian State Mountaineers (2005–2007): The Mountaineers won 3 straight National Championships (2005, 2006, 2007) under head coach Jerry Moore before moving up to the Football Bowl Subdivision after the 2013 season.
 North Dakota State (2011–present): Led by coaches Craig Bohl, Chris Klieman, and Matt Entz, North Dakota State has won 9 National Championships in 11 years (2011, 2012, 2013, 2014, 2015, 2017, 2018, 2019, 2021) and 10 MVFC titles.  During this period they've accumulated a record of 148–11 (.931) which has included a 41–3 playoff record, a 17, 33, and 39 game winning streaks. The nine championships in 11 years is a feat not accomplished at any other level in collegiate American football history. The 2019 NDSU team went 16–0, the first team to do that since Yale in 1894.

Division II
 Northwest Missouri State from 1996 to 2016 Led by coaches Mel Tjeerdsma and coach Adam Dorrel. They went to the playoffs every year and played in 10 NCAA Division II national football championship games in '98, '99, '05, '06, '07, '08, '09, '13 '15 and '16. They won 6 National Championships in '98, '99, '09, '13, '15, and '16.
 Grand Valley State University, 2001–2009, led by coaches Brian Kelly and Chuck Martin; Champions in 2002, 2003, 2005, 2006, runners up in 2001 and 2009, 102–8 record over this span.

Division III
 Augustana (IL), 1983–1986 – Augustana won 4 consecutive titles from 1983 to 1986
 Mount Union, 1993–present – Mount Union won 110 consecutive regular-season games between 1994 and 2005, posted 14 undefeated regular seasons, won 16 Ohio Athletic Conference Championships, and had the best overall record in the 1990s (120–7–1 .941). They won Division III championships in 1993, 1996, 1997, 1998, 2000, 2001, 2002, 2005, 2006, 2008, 2012, and 2015 and have appeared in 19 national championship games since 1993.
 Wisconsin–Whitewater, 2005–2014 – Led by coach Lance Leipold, UW–Whitewater appeared in seven consecutive Division III championship games between 2005 and 2011.  They won Division III championships in 2007, 2009, 2010 2011, 2013, and 2014.

NAIA Football
 Carroll College (Montana) of the 2000s (decade) – 8 straight Frontier Conference Championships (2000 to 2007), six straight national semi-final appearances (2000–2005), and six NAIA National Football Championships in nine years (2002–2005,2007,2010).
 Texas A&I 7 NAIA National Championships in 11 years, 1968–1979. 3 consecutive and 5 in the decade of the 1970s: 1970-74-75-76-70. Lost only 1 NAIA Playoff Game (1968 National Championship Game—to Boise State, now a Bowl Subdivision team.
 Carson-Newman 5 NAIA National Championships in 7 years, 1983–89. Winning the title in 1983-86-88-89 outright and tied the 1984 title with Central Arkansas.
 Linfield 3 NAIA National Championships in 6 years, 1982–86; winning it in 1982-84-86.
 Westminster College (Pennsylvania) 3 NAIA National Championships in 8 years, 1970–78; winning it in 1970-77-78. Also was NAIA Champions in 1988-89-94.

Canadian football

Grey Cup
 University of Toronto Varsity Blues from 1909 to 1911 (three championships in three years)
 Queen's University from 1920 to 1922 (three championships in three years)
 Toronto Argonauts from 1945 to 1952 (five championships in eight years)
 Edmonton Eskimos from 1954 to 1956 (three championships in three years)
 Winnipeg Blue Bombers from 1958 to 1962 (four championships in five years)
 Edmonton Eskimos from 1975 to 1982 (six championships in eight years, including five consecutive)

Vanier Cup
 Western Mustangs from 1974 to 1977 (three championships in four years)
 Laval Rouge et Or from 2003 to 2018 (nine championships in 16 years, including eleven finals appearances)

Indoor American football
 Detroit Drive from 1988 to 1993 (four championships and six ArenaBowl appearances in six seasons)
 Sioux Falls Storm from 2004 to 2017 (10 championships and 13 championship game appearances in 14 seasons)
 Arizona Rattlers from 2011 to 2017 (three ArenaBowl championships, five ArenaBowl appearances and one United Bowl championship in seven seasons)

Horseshoes
 Alan Francis, 1993–present; won 14 out of 17 world championships, only player to pitch over 90%

Horse racing
 Bob Baffert trained two Triple Crown winners and five other Kentucky Derby winners.
 Calumet Farm, 1941–1958. Bred and raced two Triple Crown winners and five other Kentucky Derby winners.
 AP McCoy, 1996–2015. 20-time Champion Jockey in Britain. Two-time Cheltenham Gold Cup winner. Won Grand National in 2010 aboard Don't Push It. In 2010, he became the only jockey to ever be named BBC Sports Personality of the Year.

Ice hockey

Club

National Hockey League
The National Hockey League and the Hockey Hall of Fame officially recognize nine dynasty teams: The Leafs and Canadiens have multiple dynasty teams recognized by the HHOF.

 Ottawa Senators of 1919–1927 (4 Stanley Cup championships in 8 years) 1920, 1921, 1923, 1927
 Toronto Maple Leafs of 1946–1951 (4 Stanley Cups in 5 years) 1947–1949, 1951
 Detroit Red Wings of 1949–1955 (4 Stanley Cups in 6 years and 7 consecutive first-place finishes) 1950, 1952, 1954, 1955
 Montreal Canadiens of 1955–1960 (5 consecutive Stanley Cups) 1956–1960
 Toronto Maple Leafs of 1962–1967 (4 Stanley Cups in 6 years) 1962–1964, 1967
 Montreal Canadiens of 1964–1969 (4 Stanley Cups in 5 years) 1965, 1966, 1968, 1969
 Montreal Canadiens of 1975–1979 (4 consecutive Stanley Cups) 1976–1979
 New York Islanders of 1980–1984 (4 consecutive Stanley Cups and 19 consecutive playoff series wins) 1980–1984
 Edmonton Oilers of 1984–1990 (5 Stanley Cups in 7 years) 1984, 1985, 1987, 1988, 1990

Kontinental Hockey League
The Soviet Championship League is now known as the Kontinental Hockey League.
 HC CSKA Moscow:  32 Soviet Championship League titles from 1946 to 1947 to 1988–89, including all but six from 1955 to 1989 and 13 in a row from 1977 to 1989.
 HC Dynamo Moscow: 1990–1993. Four consecutive championships.

World Hockey Association
 Winnipeg Jets (1972–1996) of 1976–79 (3 AVCO World Cups in 4 years) 1976, 1978–1979

Collegiate

NCAA Division I Men's Ice Hockey
 Michigan Wolverines: 1948–1957, 6 championships and 1 runner-up in 10 tournaments.
 Denver Pioneers: 1958–1964, 3 championships and 2 runners-up in 7 tournaments.
 Minnesota Golden Gophers: 1974–1981, 3 championships and 2 runners-up in 8 tournaments. The majority of players during this stretch hailed from the state of Minnesota and eight players were members of the 1980 U.S. Miracle on Ice team.
 Boston College Eagles: 2006–2012, 3 championships and 2 runners-up in 7 tournaments.
 Minnesota-Duluth Bulldogs: 2011-Current, 3 championships and 1 runners-up in 7 tournaments.  This dynasty is currently ongoing with Minnesota-Duluth winning back-to-back National Championships in 2018, and 2019; the first back-to-back men's ice hockey National Champions since Denver University Pioneers won in 2004, and 2005.

International

Men's Ice Hockey World Championships
 Canada 1920–1962. Canada won 19 (66%) of the 29 International Ice Hockey Federation's (IIHF) World Championships from 1920 to 1962 and were silver medalists at another 6 (21%) during the same time period. Canada won a medal at 90% of all world championship and Olympic tournaments during this stretch.  Canada withdrew from competition against the "pseudo-amateur" players of the Soviet Union for most of the 1970s.
 Soviet Union 1963–1990. This stretch is the most dominant stretch of all time in international play, with the Soviets winning nearly every world championship and Olympic tournament between 1963 and 1990 and never failing to medal in any IIHF tournament they competed. However, their dominance is marred by controversy over their use of state-funded players, circumventing the amateur rules that were in place at the time.
 Czechoslovakia 1976–1985. The Czechoslovakians won 3 gold and 4 silver medals in 8 tournaments.
 Sweden 1986–1998. Sweden won 4 gold and 5 silver medals in 12 tournaments.
 Czech Republic 1999–2001. Three consecutive world championships.
 Canada 2003–2009. Canada had another dynasty stretch from 2003 to 2009 having won 3 gold and 3 silver medals in 7 tournaments.
 Russia 2008–2015. Russia is recognized by the IIHF as the successor to the Soviet Union, and the USSR's ranking have been passed on to Russia, which began competing internationally in 1993. Russia's latest dynasty stretch saw them win 4 golds and 2 silvers in 8 tournaments.
 Finland 2019–2022. Finland won 3 gold medals and 1 silver in 4 consecutive major tournaments. This dynasty stretch includes winning the Olympic tournament and World Championship in the same year, the latter at home – both extremely rare achievements. During the stretch Finland won 31 games out of 36, losing only once in regular time (winning 86.11% of all games and 91.67% of playoff round games), allowing just 51 goals on total (GAA 1.416).

Women's Ice Hockey World Championships
 Canada 1990–2007. Canada won gold in 9 of the first 10 tournaments including the first 8 in a row.
 United States 2008–2019. The United States have won gold in 8 of 9 tournaments including 5 in a row.

Olympics
 Canada women's national ice hockey team: 2002–2014, four Straight Gold Medals in 2002, 2006, 2010, and 2014.

Figure skating
 Russian pairs skaters, 1965–2010

Lacrosse

Club
 Toronto Rock of 1999–2005 (five championships in seven years) 1999, 2000, 2002, 2003, 2005
 Rochester Knighthawks of 2012–2014 (three straight championships) 2012, 2013, 2014
 Saskatchewan Rush/Edmonton Rush of 2015–2018 (three championships in four years, as well as four straight Champion's Cup appearances) 2015, 2016, 2018

Collegiate

NCAA men's
 Hobart Statesmen won thirteen national titles from 1980 to 1993, including twelve straight titles from 1980 to 1991.

NCAA women's
 Maryland Terrapins won eight national titles from 1992 to 2001, capturing seven consecutive titles from 1995 to 2001 and completing four undefeated seasons.
 Northwestern Wildcats won seven national titles from 2005 to 2012, capturing five consecutive titles from 2005 to 2009, national runner-up in 2010, and two more titles in 2011 and 2012. Northwestern completed two undefeated seasons in 2005 and 2009.

Motorsports

24 Hours of Le Mans
 Tom Kristensen won nine 24 Hours of Le Mans between 1997 and 2013, including six consecutive from 2000 to 2005.

Baja 1000
 Honda motorcycles won seventeen consecutive Baja 1000 races from 1997 to 2013.

Dakar Rally
 KTM motorcycles won seventeen consecutive Dakar Rallies from 2001 to 2018.

Formula 1

Drivers
 Juan Manuel Fangio won five Formula One World Drivers' Championships between 1951 and 1957, including four consecutive from 1954 to 1957.
 Michael Schumacher won seven championships between 1994 and 2004, including five consecutive with Ferrari from 2000 to 2004.
 Sebastian Vettel won four consecutive championships between 2010 and 2013.
 Lewis Hamilton won seven Formula One championships from 2008 to 2020, including 6 in 7 years from 2014 to 2020. Hamilton additionally served as a runner-up twice in the eleven season span.

Teams
 Ferrari won four Formula One constructors' championships in five seasons between 1975 and 1979, including three consecutive from 1975 to 1977.
 McLaren won six Formula One constructors' championships in eight seasons between 1984 and 1991, including four consecutive from 1988 to 1991.
 Williams won five Formula One constructors' championships in six seasons between 1992 and 1997, including three consecutive from 1992 to 1994.
 Ferrari won eight Formula One constructors' championships in ten seasons between 1999 and 2008, including six consecutive from 1999 to 2004.
 Red Bull won four consecutive Formula One constructors' championships from 2010 to 2013.
 Mercedes has won eight consecutive Formula One constructors' championships from 2014 to 2021.

NASCAR
 Chevrolet since 1958 won 35 of 54 (64.8%) NASCAR manufacturer championships.
 Hendrick Motorsports has had two streaks of four or more consecutive championships and has 15 NASCAR championships overall. The combined operations of the works and satellite teams have won six consecutive championships, since 2006.
 Lee Petty won three championships in 1954, 1958, and 1959.
 Richard Petty won seven championships in 1964, 1967, 1971, 1972, 1974, 1975, and 1979. He also won a record of 200 races.
 David Pearson won three championships in 1966, 1968, and 1969.
 Cale Yarborough won three consecutive championships in 1976, 1977, and 1978.
 Dale Earnhardt Sr. won seven championships in 1980, 1986, 1987, 1990, 1991, 1993, and 1994.
 Darrell Waltrip won three championships in 1981, 1982, and 1985.
 Jeff Gordon won four championships in 1995, 1997, 1998, and 2001.
 Jimmie Johnson won seven championships, including five consecutive in 2006, 2007, 2008, 2009, 2010, 2013, and 2016.

World Rally Championship
 Sébastien Loeb from 2004 to 2012 won nine consecutive drivers’ championships; 78 rally wins from 2002 to 2013.

Rugby league

Clubs

English Rugby League and Super League
 Leeds from 2007 to 2012 (five League Championships in six years: 2007–2009, 2011–2012)
 Wigan from 1984 to 1985 to 1995–96 (seven consecutive League Championships, eight overall: 1986–87, 1989–90 to 1995–96; eight consecutive Challenge Cups, nine overall: 1984–85, 1987–88 to 1994–95; seven Regal Trophies; three World Club Challenge Cups: 1987, 1991, 1994)

National Rugby League
 Balmain from 1915 to 1920 (five Premierships in six years: 1915–1917, 1919–1920)
 Balmain from 1939 to 1948 (four premierships, 1939, 1944, 1946, 1947 from six grand final appearances)
 South Sydney from 1923 to 1932 (seven premierships in eight seasons 1925–1929, 1931–1932; runners-up: 1923–1924)
 Eastern Suburbs from 1934 to 1938 (five consecutive Grand Finals; three consecutive Premierships: 1935–1937)
 South Sydney from 1949 to 1955 (seven consecutive Grand Finals; five Premierships: 1950–1951, 1953–1955)
 South Sydney from 1967 to 1971 (four premierships from five grand final appearances)
 St. George from 1956 to 1966 (eleven consecutive Premierships)
 Parramatta from 1981 to 1986 (four premierships from five grand final appearances including three premierships in a row, 1981, 1982 and 1983)

International
 Australia national rugby league team, 1972–2005. Rugby League World Cup champions in 7 consecutive tournaments from 1975 to 2000, never lost a test series for 33 consecutive years.

Interstate (Australian)
 Queensland from 2006 to 2017 won 11 series including 8 consecutive State of Origin series from 2006 to 2013.

Rugby union

Clubs
 Toulouse 1994–2005, they won 6 Top 14 between 1994 and 2001 and won the very first Heineken Cup in 1996. Toulouse won two more European titles in 2003 and 2005 becoming the most successful European team with four titles.
 Crusaders 1998–2008 2017-Present, they reached 17 Super Rugby finals, of which they won 13 (Including two Covid-19 effected domestic titles in 2020 and 2021).
 Leinster 2008–2012, Heineken Cup Champions 2009, 2011, 2012
 Toulon (2013–2015), first club ever to win three consecutive European club championships—the last two Heineken Cups in 2013 and 2014, and the inaugural European Rugby Champions Cup in 2015.

Collegiate
 Bowling Green State University Men's Rugby Team has won 34 consecutive Mid-American Conference (MAC) championship since 1982 (two were won in one year when the season switched from spring to fall)
 California Golden Bears rugby, 1980–2017. The Golden Bears have won 33 championships since the national collegiate championship for rugby began in 1980. Current head coach and Cal alumnus Jack Clark took over the team in 1984, and has achieved prolonged success, leading the Bears to 28 national titles, including twelve consecutive championships from 1991 to 2002, five more consecutive titles from 2004 to 2008, and back-to-back titles in 2010 to 2011 and 2016 to 2017.

International
 New Zealand All Blacks 2010–2019, ranked No. 1 in the world, won the 2011 and 2015 World Cups and, won 6 Rugby Championships in 8 years.

Swimming

Collegiate
 Indiana University won six consecutive NCAA championships from 1968 to 1973 in men's swimming and diving. The Hoosiers also finished second at the NCAA's five times in 1964–66 and 1974–75, third in 1967, and fourth (twice) in 1976–77. This totals 14 straight years that Indiana finished in the top four teams in the nation. From 1961 to 1985 the Hoosiers won 23 out of 25 Big Ten Championships (every year but 1981–82) including 20 straight from 1961 to 1980. Olympian Mark Spitz, who won seven gold medals and set seven world records at the 1972 Olympics, was a member of the 1969–72 NCAA Championship teams.
 Auburn University earned 13 total NCAA championships in swimming and diving, eight by the men's team and five by the women's team during a 13-year period from 1997 to 2009. During that stretch, the Auburn Tigers men won five consecutive national championships and the women won three consecutive national championships. In the Southeastern Conference (SEC), Auburn men earned 16 consecutive team titles between 1997 and 2012 while the women took five non-consecutive SEC championships. Auburn swimmers won 18 medals at the 2008 Summer Olympics, more than many countries.

High school
 The Carmel, Indiana girls swim team has won a national record 33 state team titles, including one that was made in 1982, and also 32 straight state team titles from 1985 to 2017, making them the all-time best high school sports program in the country.  Their 2015 win broke the tie with the Honolulu Punahou boys swimming team, who had won 29 straight from 1958 to 1986.

Tennis

Singles
 Roger Federer, 2004–2007, Spent 237 consecutive weeks as the World Number 1. Won 11 of 20 Major titles during the period.
 Novak Djokovic, 2011–present. Since the beginning of 2011, Djokovic has won 19 grand slams, spent 347 weeks (and counting) at world number 1 (a record), finished as Year End #1 a record 7 times, and cemented a positive head-to-head record against his two main rivals, Roger Federer and Rafael Nadal.

Team competitions
 Australian Davis Cup team, 1950–1967
 Kalamazoo College men's tennis team has won 77 consecutive Michigan Intercollegiate Athletic Association championships (1936–2015) with a record of 426–2 in the MIAA from 1935 to 2007. Kalamazoo has won seven NCAA Division III national championships and has made 25 consecutive NCAA III tournament appearances.

Volleyball
 The NCAA Division I Penn State Nittany Lions women's volleyball team won four consecutive National Championships from 2007 to 2010, including two perfect seasons in 2008 and 2009, and then the Nittany Lions repeated in 2013 & 2014, to make it six Championships in eight years and seven overall titles with the first title coming in 1999; and Big Ten Conference Championships from 2003 to 2010, 2013 and 2014.
 The Concordia University (Saint Paul) women's volleyball team have captured NCAA Division II Championships in seven consecutive seasons – the only NCAA volleyball program to accomplish the feat at the Division I or II levels. Their seven total volleyball titles is more than any program as well, with the sport dating back to 1980, at the women's Division II level. Their head coach, Brady Starkey, boasts a 306–26 overall record (.926) making him the winningest active NCAA volleyball coach in any division by overall percentage. They have also mounted 9 consecutive conference Northern Sun Intercollegiate Conference championships (from 2003 to 2011) including 6-undefeated conference campaigns.
 The NCAA Division III Washington University in St. Louis women's volleyball team were the first volleyball team to win six consecutive national championships, from 1991 to 1996. They have won a total of 10 NCAA championships, including 26 consecutive appearances in the championship tournament dating back to 1987, the most of any program at any level.

Wrestling
 Oklahoma State University Cowboys On the national level, the Cowboys have won 34 NCAA team titles, crowned 141 NCAA individual champions and earned 450 All-America honors. At the conference level, OSU has won 51 league titles as a team, and Cowboy wrestlers combined to win 277 individual conference championships.
 University of Iowa Hawkeyes have 24 total NCAA championships.  The dynasty runs are from 1975 to 1986 (11 NCAA championships in 12 years), from 1991 to 2000 (9 NCAA championships in 10 years) and three consecutive national championships from 2008 to 2010. Iowa also had a dynasty run of 25 straight Big Ten conference tournament championships from 1974 to 1998.
 Penn State University Nittany Lions won four consecutive NCAA team championships from 2011 to 2014 and then won four consecutive again from 2016 to 2019 to make it eight titles in nine years. They were led by head coach Cael Sanderson, three-time champion Ed Ruth, and two-time champion plus two-time Dan Hodge Trophy winner David Taylor.

Dynasties in question 
Most disputes about dynasties relate to teams that dominated within a conference or division, but either failed to win championships or infrequently won championships.  This is exacerbated in NCAA Football Bowl Subdivision (formerly Division I-A), where the national champion is determined, at least in part, by poll rather than through a tournament.
 Atlanta Braves from 1991 to 2005. They won 14 straight division titles, made a record eight NLCS appearances, and won 5 NL pennants during the 1990s. However, they could only win one World Series in 1995.
 Buffalo Bills won four consecutive AFC Championships from 1990 to 1993, the only team ever to do so, and for this they are sometimes considered a dynasty.  However, they went on to lose the Super Bowl all four times; the Bills' AFC dominance partially overlapped with the Dallas Cowboys dynasty.
 Boise State Broncos football from 1998 to 2008. At 113–26, their 81.29% win rate was the highest in the nation. Won ten of twelve conference championships from 1999 to 2009, undefeated in conference play in 2002, 2003, 2004, 2006, 2008, and 2009, perfect seasons in 2006 and 2009, but has never been selected to play in the Division I-A national championship.

 Detroit Red Wings of the mid-1990s through the late 2000s. Although not officially listed by the NHL as a dynasty, the Red Wings won four Stanley Cups in eleven seasons (1997, 1998, 2002, 2008) and went to the Stanley Cup Finals six times in fourteen seasons (1995, 1997, 1998, 2002, 2008, and 2009). The Red Wings had the best team record during both the 1990s and 2000s, accumulating the most points of any franchise during each decade. Detroit won the Presidents' Trophy for the best regular season record in the NHL in 1995, 1996, 2002, 2004, 2006 and 2008, in all winning their division thirteen times during this span. The Red Wings qualified for the playoffs in 25 consecutive seasons from 1991 through 2016.
 Chicago Blackhawks of the early 2010s are also not officially listed by the NHL as a dynasty, but won three Stanley Cups in six seasons (2010, 2013, and 2015), as well as a Presidents Trophy in 2013 and acknowledgment by the NHL as their "Franchise of the Decade" for the 2010s. When they were presented with their third Stanley Cup in 2015, NHL Commissioner Gary Bettman colloquially referred to the team as a "dynasty" as well.
 England national rugby union team 1991–2003, 7 Five/Six Nations Championships, four Grand Slams, 2003 World Cup. While England was the form team in Europe in the 1990s, they were unable to break through and win the World Cup until 2003, losing to Australia in the final of 1991 and failing to match the same performance in 1995 and 1999. Additionally, England struggled to beat the leading southern hemisphere sides, the Springboks and the New Zealand All Blacks  until 2000 and 2002 respectively, with the team peaking from 2002 to early 2004, under the leadership of Clive Woodward, before a slow, long decline, foreshadowing the north–south divide in rugby that was to be come the norm from the mid-2000s.
 San Antonio Spurs of 1999 to 2014 led by Tim Duncan. (five NBA championships (1999, 2003, 2005, 2007, 2014) in sixteen seasons, six Western Conference titles, eleven division championships, and seventeen consecutive playoff appearances from 1998 to 2014, with a .705 win percentage during that span, the highest in any of the four major American sports) are considered a dynasty by some, but not by others because they did not win consecutive titles.

 San Francisco Giants: From 2010 to 2014. Led by manager Bruce Bochy, Buster Posey, Madison Bumgarner, Pablo Sandoval and Hunter Pence. The Giants won three World Series Championships in a 5-year span (2010, 2012, and 2014). They are only the second NL team ever, since the 1940s St. Louis Cardinals, to do so. However, despite winning three championships, some do not consider the Giants a dynasty because they did not win consecutive titles nor did they even make the playoffs in the years between (2011 and 2013, the latter of which had them post a losing record).
 University of Southern California football, 2002–2005 – two consecutive AP national championships (2003 and 2004), appearance in the 2005 National Championship Game, seven straight Pac-10 titles, six major bowl wins in seven years (Rose: 2003 and 2007–2009, Orange: 2004 and 2005), and maintained a 34-game winning streak from 2003 to 2005. However, USC was forced to vacate two wins from the 2004 season including the Orange Bowl win and BCS national Championship, all wins from the 2005 season, and the Pac-10 titles from both of those seasons as the result of rules violations involving star running back Reggie Bush.
 Washington Redskins 1982–1992, led by head coach Joe Gibbs and with running back John Riggins and the Hogs, the Redskins made seven playoff appearances and won three of their four Super Bowl appearances over the course of a decade. However, once Gibbs retired, the Redskins never returned to a Super Bowl with their last appearance being Super Bowl XXVI and the most plausible reason why they weren't considered a dynasty at the time was due to the fact that they were overshadowed by the 49ers dynasty.
 Houston Astros: From 2017 to Present. Under the ownership of Jim Crane and led by players such as Jose Altuve, Justin Verlander, and Alex Bregman, the Astros have won five AL West titles in six seasons, played in the ALCS a record six consecutive years, and won four AL Pennants and two World Series Titles. Although their high consistency within the American League has been noted, many baseball fans debate whether this team is a dynasty due to the Houston Astros sign stealing scandal, the team only having won two World Series titles separated by five seasons, and because only five players were on both championship teams.
 Oakland/Los Angeles Raiders: 1967-85. No NFL team enjoyed more consistent success than the Raiders during this span. During this 17-year run, the Raiders won 11 division titles, earned 15 playoff berths, captured one AFL title and three Super Bowls. The '76 Raiders captured the franchise's first Super Bowl after going 13-1 during the regular season. They then dismantled the defending two-time champion Steelers in the AFC title game before routing the Vikings in Super Bowl XI. Four years later, coach Tom Flores and quarterback Jim Plunkett helped the Raiders become the first franchise to win the Super Bowl as a wild-card team. The '83 Raiders, on the strength of running back Marcus Allen and cornerbacks Lester Hayes and Mike Haynes, held Washington's record-setting offense to just one touchdown in the Raiders' 38-8 win in Super Bowl XVIII.

Notes
The 1916 and 1917 VFA seasons were cancelled due to World War IThe Football League suspended operations between 1939–40 and 1945–46 inclusive due to World War II and planning difficulties in its aftermath.
Also called Tripletta Tricolore, Italian Football Federation (FIGC) regards the national supercup legally as a seasonal competition in its own official matches calendar.
The Allied conquest of Italy caused normal Serie A football to be suspended between 1943 and 1944 and 1945–46, though the 1946 scudetto is considered official.

References

Sports terminology